Northern Cypriot identity cards are issued by the government of the de facto state of Northern Cyprus for the purpose of identitification. It can be used as a travel document to enter Turkey and Cyprus (only at the land border with North Cyprus).

See also
 Northern Cypriot passport
 Cypriot identity card

References

Northern Cyprus
Law of Northern Cyprus